The 2018 Commonwealth Games (officially the XXI Commonwealth Games) are being held in Gold Coast, Australia, from 4 to 15 April 2018.

This article contains a chronological summary of major events from the Games.

Calendar

Day 0 — Wednesday 4 April

Opening ceremony
 The opening ceremony was held at Carrara Stadium at 19:00 AEST (UTC+10).

Day 1 — Thursday 5 April

Detailed results (day 1)

Summary table (day 1)

See also

References

2018 Commonwealth Games
Chronological summaries of the Commonwealth Games